Yunkani (Aymara yunka warm or temperate Andes or earth, -ni a suffix to indicate ownership, 'the one with a warm valley', Hispanicized spelling Yuncane) is a   mountain in the Andes of southern Peru. It is situated in the Moquegua Region, Mariscal Nieto Province, Carumas District, and in the Tacna Region, Candarave Province, Candarave District. Yunkani lies southwest of the mountain Paxsi Awki and northwest of the mountain Wisk'acha and Wisk'acha Lake.

References

Mountains of Moquegua Region
Mountains of Tacna Region
Mountains of Peru